Techlog is a Schlumberger owned Windows based software platform intended to aggregate all the wellbore information. It allows the user to interpret any log and core data. It addresses the need for a single platform able to support all the wellbore data and interpretation integration workflows, reducing the need for a multitude of highly specialized tools. By bringing the whole workflow into a single platform risk and uncertainty can be assessed throughout the life of the wellbore.

History of Techlog

Techlog software was developed in Montpellier (South of France) by a company called Techsia. Techsia were formed in 2000. The first version of Techlog was commercially available in 2002. Techlog was developed to have a familiar modern interface providing easy visualization and interaction of all the data, with a pre-arranged workflow that enabled less experienced users to follow, Techsia made the multi-well interpretation  more accessible to all technical experts. In 2009, Schlumberger acquired Techsia  and the Techlog platform and they currently support and market Techlog. Techlog offers new functionality in each new release, not only in petrophysical and geological interpretation but also geomechanics interpretation, uncertainty and links to the industry standard platform like Petrel. Techlog also has the new acoustics module which will add much more functionality into the application.

Versions

Techlog 2010.2 released November 2010 added GeoFrame ELAN processing algorithms inside Quanti.min and the module was renamed to Quanti.Elan.
Techlog 2011.1 released May 2011 and added a new Pore Pressure module.
Techlog 2011.2 released January 2012 and added new Wellbore Stability and Acoustics modules.
Techlog 2012.1 released April 2013 and added new 3D Petrophysics module.
Techlog 2013.1 released July 2013 and added new Unconventionals, Cased Hole, Drilling Performance Analysis modules.
Techlog 2014.1 released July 2014 and added new Cement and Pipe Integrity, Shale modules.
Techlog 2014.3 released December 2014 and added Saturation Height Modeling and Performance on Data Access
Techlog 2015.1 released July 2015 and added new Studio E&P and Ocean functionalities.

See also
Petrel (reservoir software)

References

External links
 Official Schlumberger Techlog website
 Legacy Techsia Techlog website
 Techlog user group on LinkedIn

Geology software